The 1906–07 French Ice Hockey Championship was the first ice hockey championship staged in France. Sporting Club de Lyon won the championship by defeating Club des Patineurs de Paris.

Final
 Sporting Club de Lyon - Club des Patineurs de Paris 8:2 (3:1, 5:1)

External links
Season on hockeyarchives.info

Fra
Fra
1906–07